Agyneta hedini is a species of sheet weaver found in the United States. It was described by Paquin & Dupérré in 2009.

References

hedini
Spiders described in 2009
Spiders of the United States